Fairview Crossroads is an unincorporated community and census-designated place (CDP) in Lexington County, South Carolina, United States. It was first listed as a CDP prior to the 2020 census  with a population of 540.

The CDP is in southern Lexington County, centered on the junction of U.S. Route 178 and South Carolina Highway 113. US 178 leads northwest  to Batesburg-Leesville and southeast  to Pelion, while Highway 113 leads south  to Wagener.

Demographics

2020 census

Note: the US Census treats Hispanic/Latino as an ethnic category. This table excludes Latinos from the racial categories and assigns them to a separate category. Hispanics/Latinos can be of any race.

References 

Census-designated places in Lexington County, South Carolina
Census-designated places in South Carolina